Northeast High School is a public high school in St. Petersburg, Florida.  The school is part of the Pinellas County Schools district. Located just across the street from Meadowlawn Middle School and east of John M. Sexton Elementary School (named after Northeast's first principal), Northeast High School is one of the main high schools in the Saint Petersburg area.  The school mascot is the Viking and the school colors are scarlet, cream, and black.  Northeast High School is commonly referred to as NEHI.

On May 5, 1961, an F2 tornado struck the high school.

Test scores

Former principals
 Kevin K. Hendrick (2008-2010) (2012–2017)
 Paulagene Nelson (2010-2012)
 Patricia Wright (2005–2008)
 Michael A. Miller (1992–2005)
 Charley J. Williams (1989-1992)
 J. Thomas Zachary (1979-1989)
 Bill G. Williamson (1974-1979)
 Lee R. Benjamin (1970-1974)
 William G. Justice (1968-1970)
 Thomas H. Rothchild (1965-1968)
 John M. Sexton (1953-1965)

Notable alumni 
 Jeff D'Amico – former Major League Baseball player (Milwaukee Brewers, New York Mets, Pittsburgh Pirates, Cleveland Indians)
 Danielle Collins – collegiate and professional tennis player
 Tom Hume – former Major League Baseball player (Cincinnati Reds, Philadelphia Phillies)
 Craig Lefferts – former Major League Baseball player (Chicago Cubs, San Diego Padres, San Francisco Giants, Baltimore Orioles, Texas Rangers, California Angels)
 Betsy Nagelsen – former professional tennis player, Australian Open singles finalist and doubles champion
 Megan Romano – swimmer at University of Georgia
 Tony Samuels  former NFL player, tight end for Kansas City Chiefs
 Brad Snyder – Paralympic Olympic gold medalist, US Navy officer
 Doug Waechter – former Major League Baseball player (Tampa Bay Rays, Florida Marlins, Kansas City Royals)
 Frank Wren – MLB executive with Atlanta Braves, Baltimore Orioles, Boston Red Sox, Florida Marlins
 Colton Gray - Swimmer that holds two school records for the high school and got second in the state of Florida at the state championships. Continued to swim in college at Florida State University where he graduated from with honors. https://www.indianriverstateathletics.com/sports/mswimdive/2018-19/releases/20181105hf0736

Clubs 
The school's clubs include:

Athletics 
Northeast High School participates in the following sports:

Fall Sports
 Cross Country
 Football
 Golf
 Swimming
 Volleyball
 Marching Band

Winter Sports
 Boys Basketball
 Girls Basketball
 Boys Soccer
 Girls Soccer
 Wrestling

Spring Sports
 Baseball
 Flag Football
 Softball
 Tennis
 Track—2012 Girls Basketball Sportsmanship Award—Pinellas County Girls Basketball Coaches Association—2012 PCAC Flag Football District Champions—2012 PCAC Coach of the Year—Chris Holler

References 

High schools in Pinellas County, Florida
Public high schools in Florida